RiT Technologies Ltd. is a publicly traded company, headquartered in Israel, that provides clients with advanced network management systems. Its shares are traded on the NASDAQ Capital Market.

History 
RiT Technologies was founded in 1989 by Ofer Bengal, who recruited brothers Yehuda and Zohar Zisapel as chief investors in the company. RiT's first product was an electrical connector, which competed with AMP Incorporated for market share. Their next product was PatchView, a network computer cable infrastructure management system. In 1997 RiT began marketing PairView, a system for monitoring and managing copper-wire telephone networks. Shares of RiT Technologies debuted on the NASDAQ Global Market in July 1997 and were transferred to the NASDAQ Capital Market in January 2004.

Ownership 
In September 2008, Moscow-based Stins Coman Inc., RiT's distributor in the Russian Federation, acquired a majority stake of 59.1% in the company, after having acquired 7% and then an additional 34.9% of RiT's outstanding shares earlier in the year.

See also 
 Structured cabling
 List of Israeli companies quoted on the Nasdaq

References

External links 
Patents of Ofer Bengal – PatentBuddy.com
Stins Coman Corporation

Software companies of Israel
Companies established in 1989
Companies based in Tel Aviv
1989 establishments in Israel